Voronovytsia is an urban-type settlement in Vinnytsia Raion of Vinnytsia Oblast in Ukraine. It is located on the banks of the Voronka, a left tributary of the Southern Bug. Voronovytsia hosts the administration of Voronovytsia settlement hromada, one of the hromadas of Ukraine. Population: 

Voronovytsia is one of the places that claims to be the birthplace of aviation. In 1876, Alexander Mozhaysky flew a small shuttle on casters, with a spring inside, a wing and a propeller, which he called a "flyer." Mozhaysky later built the first heavier-than-air aircraft in Voronovytsia. The village was named after the Voronka River, and the settlement appeared in 1545. In 1748, by order of King August III, Voronovytsia became a town. The settlement's main attraction is the palace of Grocholski-Mozhaysky, where Mozhaysky lived and worked for seven years. The palace is an example of early classicism, and it has 43 rooms spread over 2500 square meters of total space.

Economy

Transportation
Voronovytsia railway station is on the railway connecting Vinnytsia and Haisyn. There is infrequent passenger traffic.

M30 highway which connects Vinnytsia and Kropyvnytskyi runs through the settlement.

References

Urban-type settlements in Vinnytsia Raion